DYKA (801 AM) Radyo Totoo is a radio station owned and operated by Kauswagan Broadcasting Corporation, the media arm of the Roman Catholic Diocese of San Jose de Antique. Its studio and transmitter are located at 3/F St.Joseph Center, Gen. Fullon St., San Jose de Buenavista, Antique.

References

Radio stations established in 1972
Radio stations in Antique (province)
Catholic radio stations